PRAME (preferentially expressed antigen of melanoma) is a protein that in humans is encoded by the PRAME gene. Five alternatively spliced transcript variants encoding the same protein have been observed for this gene.

Function 

This gene encodes an antigen that is predominantly expressed in human melanomas and that is recognized by cytolytic T lymphocytes. It is not expressed in normal tissues, except testis. This expression pattern is similar to that of other CT antigens, such as MAGE, BAGE and GAGE. However, unlike these other CT antigens, this gene is also expressed in acute leukemias. The overexpression of PRAME in tumor tissues and relative low levels in normal somatic tissues make it an attractive target for cancer therapy. In recent years, immunotherapy has spearheaded a new era of cancer therapy resulting in the development of numerous novel antigen-specific immunotherapy approaches. Studies on PRAME-specific immunotherapy primarily involve vaccines and cellular immunotherapies.

PRAME can inhibit retinoic acid signaling and retinoic acid mediated differentiation and apoptosis. PRAME overexpression in triple negative breast cancer has also been found to promote cancer cell motility through induction of the epithelial-to-mesenchymal transition.

Model organisms 

Model organisms have been used in the study of PRAME function. A conditional knockout mouse line called Prametm1a(KOMP)Wtsi was generated at the Wellcome Trust Sanger Institute. Male and female animals underwent a standardized phenotypic screen to determine the effects of deletion. Additional screens performed:  - In-depth immunological phenotyping

References

Further reading